Antoine Martin (19 April 1933 – 12 December 1987) was a French boxer. He competed in the men's bantamweight event at the 1952 Summer Olympics.

References

1933 births
1987 deaths
French male boxers
Olympic boxers of France
Boxers at the 1952 Summer Olympics
Boxers from Paris
Bantamweight boxers